90 ML is a 2019 Indian Tamil-language adult comedy film written and directed by Anita Udeep. The film stars Oviya in the lead role, while Anson Paul, Masoom Shankar, Monisha Ram, Shree Gopika, and Bommu Lakshmi play supporting roles. The film is produced by Udeep under Nviz Entertainment. The film's soundtrack was composed by Silambarasan with editing done by Anthony and cinematography by Aravind Krishna. The film released on 1 March 2019.

Plot
Thamarai (Bommu Lakshmi) and her husband Sathish (Tej Raj) visit a drug rehabilitation center for a counseling session with a psychologist named Dr. Priyadarshini (Devadarshini), but Sathish, who is a rowdy, walks out with haste.

Thamarai then starts to narrate how Rita (Oviya) moved to their apartment, where she mingles with the neighbors Kajal (Masoom Shankar), Paru (Shree Gopika), Suganya (Monisha Ram), and Thamarai. One day, Rita notices Thamarai crying and gets to know that it is her birthday and that her husband was not even aware of it, but she decides to throw a party at a terrace, where they all drink beer and open up their personal lives. They go to Tasmac, where Sathish comes and picks them up. Later, Thamarai and Sathish cozy up relationship and have sex, but he warns her to never meet her drunkard friends.

Eventually after sometimes, they all meet in Rita's house as Suganya asked for a party where she goes mad, but she reveals that her lover Chris is getting married at Pondicherry. They all go there, kidnap the couple, and bring them to Suganya — she runs and hugs the bride, leaving everyone in shock. They end up in a police station, where they are sent off with a warning. Rita's boyfriend and Sathish have a small scuffle.

Later, Rita's boyfriend Venky (Anson Paul) agrees for marriage, which she declines, and they break up. They all meet up with Suganya and her partner, where they decided to switch to cannabis from drinks. They seek help of two single youths to get weed, but they are chased by cops. They end up in a crossfire between Sathish and his rivalry gang, but he saves them.

Kajal then says that her husband has an affair. They all go there and ridicule him, and Paru says that she has not consummated her marriage. She confronts her husband, and he tells that he was in love with another girl and was forced into marriage, so they decide to divorce.

Finally, Thamarai cries out and seeks her friends' help to free Sathish from his bald boss. They all go to his hideout, fight the henchmen, and hold the boss at gunpoint, while Sathish comes to save him.

Later, they all are partying (again), where a guy (Simbu) says to his lover that he does not believe in marriage; he is not anyone's property, and they breakup. They all watch him and suggest that he is more like Rita. She walks to him gives him a lip lock.

Cast 
 Oviya as Rita
 Anson Paul as Venky
 Masoom Shankar as Kajal
 Monisha Ram as Suganya "Sugi"
 Shreegopika Neelanath as Paru
 Bommu Lakshmi as Thamarai
 Tej Charanraj as Sathish
 Soundariya Nanjundan as Christine "Chris"
 Arvind Sivakumar as Abhi, Kajal's husband
 Devadarshini as Dr. Priyadarshini (Cameo appearance)
 Silambarasan as Rita's fling at the bar (Cameo appearance)

Soundtrack

The soundtrack was composed by Silambarasan TR. The first single, "Marana Matta", sung by Oviya in her singing debut, was released on 31 December 2017. It was reported in May, Simbu had composed a song called "Kadhal Kadik".  Lyrical video of "Beer Briyani" song was released by Trisha.

Marketing
The first look poster was released in May 2018. Other posters were released in August 2018. The official trailer of the film was unveiled on 8 February 2019.

Release 
The film released in March 2019.

References

External links 
 

Indian coming-of-age comedy-drama films
2010s Tamil-language films
2019 films
2010s coming-of-age comedy-drama films
Films scored by Silambarasan